Laverne or La Verne is both a given name and a surname. Notable people with the name include:

Given name 

 LaVerne Andrews (1911–1967), American singer of the Andrews Sisters singing trio
 Laverne Cox (born 1972), American actress and LGBT advocate
 Laverne Harding (1905–1984), American cartoon animator
 LaVerne Jones-Ferrette (born 1981), sprinter from the U.S. Virgin Islands
 Laverne Smith (born 1954), American football player
 Harry Laverne Anderson (1952–2018), American actor

Surname 

 Andy LaVerne (born 1947), American jazz pianist, composer, and arranger
 Marc Chirik (1907–1990), also known as Marc Laverne, Communist revolutionary and one of the founding militants of the International Communist Current
 Lauren Laverne (born 1978), English disc jockey and television presenter
 Lucille La Verne (1872–1945), American actress
 Pattie Laverne (died 1916), English singer and actress
 Thomas Laverne (1917–1994), New York state senator

Fictional characters 

 Laverne De Fazio, of the television series Laverne & Shirley
 Laverne Roberts, a nurse on the television series Scrubs
 Laverne Todd, a nurse on the television series Empty Nest
 One of the characters in the television show The Cher Show
 One of the player characters in the adventure game Day of the Tentacle
 Laverne (gargoyle), one of the supporting characters from Disney's 1996 animated feature, The Hunchback of Notre Dame
 Julie LaVerne, a character in the film Show Boat (1951), played by Ava Gardner 
 Judith Laverne Hopps, the full name of Judy Hopps, the main protagonist from Disney's animated film, Zootopia
 Judge Laverne Holt, a charter in the television show, Brooklyn Nine-Nine

See also
Lavern